Anthony McGuin Rankin (October 26, 1873 – June 21, 1927) was a farmer, miller, and political figure in Ontario, Canada. He represented Frontenac in the Legislative Assembly of Ontario from 1911 to 1926 as a Conservative member.

He was born in Collins Bay, the son of David J. Rankin and Eliza J. Purdy, and was educated in Kingston. In 1901, Rankin married Jean Euris. He was reeve of Kingston township for four years. He died in 1927.

References

External links

1873 births
1927 deaths
Canadian farmers
People from Kingston, Ontario
Progressive Conservative Party of Ontario MPPs